Sattar Jabr Naser (born c. 1950s, disappeared 1978) was an Iraqi writer, who disappeared in 1978.

Biography
He was in his 20s when he published his book Reflections on the Book of Ali al-Wardi: Glimpses of the Modern History of Iraq in 1978. The book caused a stir in Baghdad's literary circles.

Disappearance
It is known that Naser was detained and tortured by the security forces of Iraqi dictator Saddam Hussein. He was released after three months. Soon after his release, he was arrested for the second, and final time, after which he disappeared.

Aftermath
Naser has never been seen since and his remains have not been found.

See also 
List of people who disappeared

References

1950s births
1970s missing person cases
20th-century Iraqi writers
Iraqi writers
Missing people
Missing person cases in Iraq